The 1932 Creighton Bluejays football team was an American football team that represented Creighton University as a member of the Missouri Valley Conference (MVC) during the 1932 college football season. In its third season under head coach Arthur R. Stark, the team compiled a 5–2–1 record (3–1 against MVC opponents) and outscored opponents by a total of 115 to 65. The team played its home games at Creighton Stadium in Omaha, Nebraska.

Schedule

References

Creighton
Creighton Bluejays football seasons
Creighton Bluejays football